It was the final year of the Cold War, which had begun in 1947. During the year, the Soviet Union collapsed, leaving fifteen sovereign republics and the CIS in its place. In July 1991, India abandoned its policies of dirigism, license raj and autarky and began extensive liberalisation to its economy. This increased GDP but also increased income inequality over the next two decades. A UN-authorized coalition force from 34 nations fought against Iraq, which had invaded and annexed Kuwait in the previous year, 1990. The conflict would be called the Gulf War and would mark the beginning of a since-constant American military presence in the Middle East. The clash between Serbia and the other Yugoslav republics would lead into the beginning of the Yugoslav Wars, which ran through the rest of the decade.

In the context of the apartheid, the year after the liberation of political prisoner Nelson Mandela, the Parliament of South Africa repeals the Population Registration Act, 1950, overturning the racial classification of the population, a key component of apartheid.

The year 1991 saw the rise of a ten-year-long boost of the US domestic economy with the Dow Jones Industrial Average remarkably closing in April at above 3,000 for the first time. This situation would only be cut short by the Dot-com bubble of 2000–2002.

In August, the World Wide Web, originally conceived during the previous year, was released outside CERN to other research institutions starting in January 1991 and publicly announced in August, also establishing the first website ever, "info.cern.ch". This step was a key factor that lead to the mid-1990s public breakthrough of the internet, which would eventually accelerate the already ongoing globalization around the globe.

In terms of popular culture, during this year alternative rock saw a new height of popularity when some of the earliest music exponents of the virtually unknown grunge sound were released, including the influential Nevermind album by Seattle-based band Nirvana in September 1991. It was also in 1991 that hip-hop music reached an unprecedented mainstream level of success. Electronic music derivative forms were also starting to gain momentum and would define, alone with the previous scenes, the sound for most of the decade.

Events

January 
 January 1 – Czechoslovakia becomes the second Eastern European country to abandon its command economy.
 January 5 – Georgian troops attack Tskhinvali, the capital of South Ossetia, starting the 1991–92 South Ossetia War.
 January 7 – 1991 Haitian coup d'état: An attempted coup by the Tonton Macoute, a paramilitary force under former dictator Jean-Claude Duvalier, is thwarted in Haiti. On July 30, he is convicted by a jury of attempting to overthrow the country's first democratically elected government.
 January 9
Gulf War: U.S. Secretary of State James Baker meets with Iraqi Foreign Minister Tariq Aziz but fails to produce a plan for the withdrawal of Iraqi troops from Kuwait.
 In Sebokeng, South Africa, gunmen open fire on mourners attending the funeral of an African National Congress leader, killing 45 people.
 January 12 – Gulf War: The 102nd U.S. Congress passes a resolution authorizing the use of military force to expel Iraqi forces from Kuwait.
 January 13
Singing Revolution: Soviet forces storm Vilnius to stop Lithuanian independence, killing 14 civilians and injuring 702 more. In Latvia, a series of confrontations between the Latvian government and the Soviet government take place in Riga.
 January 15
 Gulf War: The UN deadline for the withdrawal of Iraqi forces from occupied Kuwait expires, preparing the way for the start of Operation Desert Storm.
 Prime Minister of Cape Verde Pedro Pires resigns following his party's loss in the Cape Verdean parliamentary election, the first ever multiparty election in an African nation. Later on February 17, António Mascarenhas Monteiro wins the country's first multiparty presidential election since 1975.
 January 16 – Gulf War: Operation Desert Storm begins with air strikes against Iraq.
 January 17
Gulf War: Iraq fires eight Scud missiles into Israel. Iraqi attacks continue with 15 people injured in Tel Aviv on January 19 and 96 people injured in Ramat Gan on January 22.
Harald V of Norway becomes the king of Norway after the death of his father, Olav V.
 January 18 – Eastern Air Lines shuts down after 62 years of operations, citing financial problems. Later on December 4, Pan American World Airways ceases its operations.
 January 22 – Gulf War: The British Army SAS patrol, Bravo Two Zero, is deployed in Iraq.
 January 24 – The government of Papua New Guinea signs a peace agreement with separatist leaders from Bougainville Island, ending fighting that had gone on since 1988.
 January 26 – President Siad Barre is overthrown and Somalia enters a civil war. Three days later, Ali Mahdi Muhammad is inaugurated as the next president.
 January 29
 In South Africa, Nelson Mandela of the African National Congress and Mangosuthu Buthelezi of the Inkatha Freedom Party agree to end violence between the two organizations.
 Gulf War: The first major ground engagement of the war, the Battle of Khafji, begins. The battle lasts until February 1.

February 
 February 1
USAir Flight 1493 collides with a SkyWest Airlines Fairchild Metroliner at Los Angeles International Airport, killing 34 people.
 A 6.4  Hindu Kush earthquake causes severe damage in northeast Afghanistan, leaving 848 dead and 200 injured.
 February 7
1991 Haitian coup d'état: Haiti's first democratically elected president, Jean-Bertrand Aristide, is sworn in. He is ousted on September 30 and later reinstated in 1994. In response to the coup and in an effort to encourage the coup leaders to restore democracy, the U.S. expands trade sanctions on Haiti to include all goods except food and medicine on October 29.
 The Provisional Irish Republican Army launches a mortar attack on 10 Downing Street during a cabinet meeting.
 Gulf War: Ground troops cross the Saudi Arabian border and enter Kuwait, thus starting the ground phase of the war.
 February 11 – The Unrepresented Nations and Peoples Organization (UNPO) is formed in The Hague, Netherlands.
 February 13 – Gulf War: Two laser-guided "smart bombs" destroy an underground bunker in Baghdad, killing hundreds of Iraqis. US military intelligence claims it was a military facility while Iraqi officials identify it as a bomb shelter.
 February 15 – The Visegrád Group, establishing cooperation to move toward free-market systems, is signed by the leaders of Czechoslovakia, Hungary, and Poland.
 February 16 – Singing Revolution: The Council of Lithuania declares the independence of Lithuania, ending decades of Soviet rule over the country.
 February 18 – The Provisional Irish Republican Army explodes bombs in the early morning, at both Paddington station and Victoria station, in London.
 February 20 – President of Albania Ramiz Alia dismisses the government of Prime Minister Adil Çarçani and appoints Fatos Nano as the next prime minister in an effort to stem pro-democracy protests.
 February 22 – Gulf War: Iraq accepts a Soviet-proposed cease fire agreement. The U.S. rejects the agreement, instead saying that retreating Iraqi forces will not be attacked if they leave Kuwait within 24 hours.
 February 23 – In Thailand, General Sunthorn Kongsompong deposes Prime Minister Chatichai Choonhavan in a bloodless coup d'état.
 February 25 – Gulf War: Part of an Iraqi Scud missile hits an American military barracks in Dhahran, Saudi Arabia, killing 29 U.S. soldiers and injuring 99 more. It is the single-most devastating attack on U.S. forces during the war.
 February 26 – Gulf War: On Baghdad radio, Iraqi leader Saddam Hussein announces the withdrawal of Iraqi troops from Kuwait. Iraqi soldiers set fire to Kuwaiti oil fields as they retreat; the fire lasts until November 7.
 February 27
 Gulf War: U.S. President Bush declares victory over Iraq and orders a cease-fire. U.S. troops begin to leave the Persian Gulf on March 10.
 In the Bangladeshi general election, the Bangladesh Nationalist Party wins 139 of 300 seats in the Jatiyo Sangshad, leading BNP leader Khaleda Zia to become the president on March 19.

March 
March 3
 Singing Revolution: Voters in Estonia and Latvia vote more than 3-to-1 in favor of independence from the Soviet Union.
 The first presidential election in the history of São Tomé and Príncipe is won by Miguel Trovoada.
A video captures the beating of motorist Rodney King by Los Angeles police officers. Four Los Angeles police officers are indicted on March 15 for the beating.
 March 6 – Prime Minister of India Chandra Shekhar resigns following a dispute with former Prime Minister Rajiv Gandhi, whose support had kept him in power.
 March 9 – Massive demonstrations are held against Slobodan Milošević in Belgrade; two people are killed and tanks are deployed in the streets.
 March 10 – Salvadoran Civil War: In the Salvadoran legislative election, the Nationalist Republican Alliance wins 39 of the 48 seats in the legislative assembly.
 March 13 
 The U.S. Department of Justice announces that Exxon has agreed to pay $1 billion for the clean-up of the Exxon Valdez oil spill in Alaska.
 The Acid Rain Treaty of 1991 is signed between the American and Canadian governments.
 March 14
Gulf War: Emir of Kuwait Jaber Al-Ahmad Al-Sabah returns to Kuwait after seven months of exile in Saudi Arabia.
The Troubles: After 16 years in prison for allegedly bombing a public house in a Provisional IRA attack, the "Birmingham Six" are freed when a court determines that the police fabricated evidence.
 March 15
Germany formally regains complete independence after the four post-World War II occupying powers (France, the U.K., the U.S., and the U.S.S.R.) relinquish all remaining rights to the country.
 The U.S. and Albania resume diplomatic relations for the first time since 1939.
 March 17
 Dissolution of the Soviet Union: In a national referendum, 77% of voters in the Soviet Union vote in favor of keeping the 15 Soviet republics together; six Union Republics effectively boycott the referendum.
 In the Finnish parliamentary election, the Centre Party wins 55 of 200 seats in the parliament, ending 25 years of dominance by the Social Democratic Party of Finland.
 March 23 – The Sierra Leone Civil War begins when the Revolutionary United Front attempts a coup against the Sierra Leone government.
 March 24 – The Beninese presidential election, Benin's first presidential election since 1970, is won by Nicéphore Soglo.
 March 26
 In Mali, military officers led by Amadou Toumani Touré arrest President Moussa Traoré and suspend the constitution.
 Argentina, Brazil, Uruguay and Paraguay sign the Treaty of Asunción, establishing Mercosur.
 March 31
Albania holds its first multi-party elections since 1923. The socialist ruling Party of Labour of Albania won a landslide victory with 169 of the 250 seats in the parliament.
Dissolution of the Soviet Union: Georgia votes for independence from the Soviet Union while on April 9, the Supreme Council declares the independent Republic of Georgia.

April 
 April 2 – Government-imposed prices increase double or triple the cost of consumer goods in the Soviet Union.
 April 3 – Iraq disarmament crisis: The UN Security Council passes Resolution 687, which calls for the destruction or removal of all of Iraq's chemical and biological weapons and a complete ban of ballistic missiles with a range greater than 150 km. It also calls for an end to Iraq's support for international terrorism; it is accepted by Iraq three days later.
 April 4
 U.S. Senator John Heinz and six other people are killed when a helicopter collides with their plane over Merion, Pennsylvania.
 Forty people are taken hostage in Sacramento, California; six gunmen and hostages are killed.
 April 5
 Former U.S. Senator John Tower and 22 others are killed in an airplane crash in Brunswick, Georgia.
Space Shuttle Atlantis leaves an observatory in Earths orbit to study gamma rays before returning on April 11. It is followed by Space Shuttle Discovery, which studies instruments related to the Strategic Defense Initiative from April 29 to May 6. Space Shuttle Columbia carries the Spacelab into orbit on June 5.
 April 9 – The first Soviet troops leave Poland.
 April 10
 A South Atlantic tropical cyclone develops in the Southern Hemisphere off the coast of Angola, the first of its kind to be documented by weather satellites.
 The Italian ferry Moby Prince collides with an oil tanker in dense fog off Livorno, Italy, resulting in 140 deaths with one survivor. 
 April 12 – The Warsaw Stock Exchange opens in Poland.
April 14 – In the Netherlands, thieves steal 20 paintings worth $500 million from the Van Gogh Museum in Amsterdam; they are found in an abandoned car near the museum less than an hour later.
 April 15
 The European Bank for Reconstruction and Development (EBRD) is inaugurated.
 End of Apartheid: The European Economic Community lifts economic sanctions on South Africa.
 April 16 – 18 – General Secretary of the Communist Party of the Soviet Union Mikhail Gorbachev begins the first ever visit of a Soviet leader to Japan, but fails to resolve the two countries' dispute over ownership of the Kuril Islands.
 April 17 – The Dow Jones Industrial Average closes above 3,000 for the first time in history, at 3,004.46.
 April 18 – Iraq disarmament crisis: Iraq declares some of its chemical weapons and materials to the UN, as required by Resolution 687, and claims that it does not have a biological weapons program.
 April 19 – George Carey is enthroned as Archbishop of Canterbury, the spiritual leader of the worldwide Anglican Communion.
 April 22
A 7.7  Limon earthquake strikes Costa Rica and Panama with a maximum Mercalli intensity, causing between 47 and 87 deaths and up to 759 injuries.
In Taiwan, the Temporary Provisions against the Communist Rebellion are abolished, having been in effect for 43 years.
April 23 – Prime Minister of Iceland Steingrímur Hermannsson resigns following an inconclusive parliamentary election; he is succeeded by Davíð Oddsson on April 30.
 April 26
 A series of 55 tornadoes break out in the central U.S., killing 21. The most notable tornado strikes Andover, Kansas.
 Esko Aho at the age of 36 becomes the youngest-ever Prime Minister of Finland.
 April 29
 A tropical cyclone hits Bangladesh, killing an estimated 138,000 people.
 A 7.0  earthquake in Racha, Georgia, kills 270 people and leaves 100,000 others homeless.
 April 29 – 30 – In Lesotho, a bloodless coup ousts military ruler Justin Lekhanya, with Chairman of the Military Council Elias Phisoana Ramaema replacing him two days later.

May
 May 1 – Angolan Civil War: The MPLA and UNITA agree to the Bicesse Accords, which are formally signed on May 31 in Lisbon.
 May 6 – In the U.S., Time magazine publishes "The Thriving Cult of Greed and Power," an article highly critical of the Scientology movement.
 May 12 – Nepal holds its first multiparty legislative election since 1959.
 May 15 – Édith Cresson becomes France's first female prime minister.
 May 16 – Elizabeth II becomes the first British monarch to address the U.S. Congress during a 13-day royal visit in Washington, D.C.
 May 18 – Somaliland secedes from Somalia; its independence is not recognised by the international community.
 May 19 – Dissolution of Yugoslavia: In the Croatian independence referendum, voters in the Socialist Republic of Croatia vote to leave SFR Yugoslavia.
 May 21
At Sriperumbudur, India, a suicide bomber from LTTE attacks a political meeting, killing former Prime Minister Rajiv Gandhi and at least 14 others.
Ethiopian Civil War: Mengistu Haile Mariam, president of the People's Democratic Republic of Ethiopia, flees Ethiopia to Zimbabwe, effectively bringing the Ethiopian Civil War to an end.
 May 22 – Acting Prime Minister of South Korea Ro Jai-bong resigns in the wake of rioting following the beating to death of a student by police on April 26. He is succeeded by Chung Won-shik two days later.
 May 24 – Following authorisation by Israeli Prime Minister Yitzhak Shamir, Operation Solomon commences to airlift most of the remaining Beta Israel community from Ethiopia to Israel.
May 25 – The Surinamese general election is won by the military-backed New Front for Democracy and Development.
 May 26 – Lauda Air Boeing 767 crashes near Bangkok, Thailand, killing all 223 people on board.
 May 28 – Ethiopian Civil War: The forces of the Ethiopian People's Revolutionary Democratic Front seize the capital Addis Ababa.

June

 June 3 – Mount Unzen in Japan erupts, killing 46 people as a result of pyroclastic flow.
 June 4 
Fatos Nano resigns as Prime Minister of Albania following a nationwide strike. President of Albania Ramiz Alia appoints Ylli Bufi as his successor.
 A large solar flare triggers an anomalously large aurora as far south as Pennsylvania.
 June 5
President of Algeria Chadli Bendjedid dismisses Prime Minister Mouloud Hamrouche following 11 days of protests against the government and replaces him with Sid Ahmed Ghozali.
 End of Apartheid: South Africa repeals the last legal foundations of apartheid.
 June 7 – Approximately 200,000 people attend a parade of 8,800 returning Persian Gulf War troops in Washington, D.C.
 June 9 – A major collapse at the Emaswati Colliery in Swaziland traps 26 miners 65 meters below the surface; they are rescued 30 hours later.
 June 12 
Boris Yeltsin is elected President of the Russian SFSR; he officially begins his term on July 10.
 Sri Lankan Civil War: Sri Lankan Army soldiers kill 152 civilians in Kokkadichcholai.
 The Party of Labour of Albania is dissolved and succeeded by the Socialist Party of Albania, marking the end of communist rule in Albania.
 June 15
 In the Philippines, Mount Pinatubo erupts in the second largest terrestrial eruption of the 20th century; the final death toll exceeds 800. This eruption caused a global cooling of the world by around 0.4°C.
 The Indian general elections end; the Indian National Congress wins the most seats but fails to secure a majority. Six days later, Congress leader P. V. Narasimha Rao becomes Prime Minister of India.
 June 16 – Father's Day Bank Massacre: Four security guards are shot to death during a bank robbery at the United Bank Tower in Denver, Colorado, United States. The person subsequently charged with the crime was acquitted, and the case remains unsolved.
 June 17
 End of Apartheid: The South African Parliament repeals the Population Registration Act, which had required racial classification of all South Africans at birth.
President of Turkey Turgut Özal appoints Mesut Yılmaz as Prime Minister following Yıldırım Akbulut's resignation. Yılmaz forms a new government on June 23, which lasts until November when it is replaced by the government of Süleyman Demirel.
 June 20 – In West Germany, the Bundestag votes to move the capital from Bonn to Berlin.
 June 20 – The murder of Harry Collinson, the planning officer for Derwentside District Council, took place in 1991 at Butsfield, County Durham, England.
 June 23 – 28 – Iraq disarmament crisis: UN inspection teams attempt to intercept Iraqi vehicles carrying nuclear related equipment. Iraqi soldiers fire warning shots in the air to prevent inspectors from approaching the vehicles.
 June 25 – Dissolution of Yugoslavia: Croatia and Slovenia declare their independence from Yugoslavia.
 June 28 – Dissolution of the Soviet Union: Comecon is dissolved in Moscow, Russia.

July 
 July 1
 In the U.S., telephone services go down in Washington, D.C., Pittsburgh, Los Angeles, and San Francisco as a result of a software bug, affecting nearly twelve million customers.
 The Warsaw Pact is officially dissolved in Prague, Czechoslovakia.
 The world's first GSM telephone call is made in Finland.
 July 7 – Dissolution of Yugoslavia: The Brioni Agreement ends the Ten-Day War in Slovenia.
 July 4 – President of Colombia César Gaviria lifts the country's 7-year-long state of emergency.
 July 9
 End of Apartheid: The International Olympic Committee readmits South Africa to the Olympics. The next day, U.S. President Bush terminates 1986-enacted U.S. sanctions on South Africa.
 Iran–Contra affair: Alan Fiers agrees to plead guilty to two charges of lying to the U.S. Congress. Later on September 16, D.C. Judge Gerhard Gesell issues a ruling clearing Col. Oliver North of all charges.
 July 11
 A solar eclipse of record totality occurs in the Northern hemisphere. It is seen by 20 million people in Hawaii, Mexico, and Colombia.
Nigeria Airways Flight 2120, a Douglas DC-8 operated by Canadian airline Nolisair, catches fire and crashes soon after takeoff from Jeddah, Saudi Arabia, killing all 261 people on board.
 July 15 – Chemical Bank and Manufacturers Hanover Corporation amalgamate, becoming the largest bank merger in history.
 July 16 – Soviet President Gorbachev arrives in London to ask for aid from the leaders of the G7.
 July 18 – The governments of Mauritania and Senegal sign a treaty ending the Mauritania–Senegal Border War, which had been fought since 1989.
 July 22
 U.S. boxer Mike Tyson is arrested and charged with the rape of Miss Black America contestant Desiree Washington three days earlier, in Indianapolis, Indiana.
 July 24 – Finance Minister of India Manmohan Singh announces a new industrial policy, marking the start of economic liberalisation in India.
 July 25 – British astronomers announce they have found what appears to be an extrasolar planet.
 July 29 – In New York City, a grand jury indicts Bank of Credit and Commerce International of the largest bank fraud in history, accusing the bank of defrauding depositors of US$5 billion.
 July 31
U.S. President Bush and Soviet President Gorbachev sign START I in Moscow, Soviet Union.
 Singing Revolution: Soviet Special Purpose Police Unit (OMON) forces kill seven Lithuanian customs officials in Medininkai, the deadliest of the Soviet OMON assaults on Lithuanian border posts.

August

 August 1 – Israel agrees to participate in the Madrid Conference of 1991, which opens on October 30.
 August 4 – The cruise liner MTS Oceanos sinks off the coast of South Africa, leading to the rescue of all 571 passengers on board by SAAF helicopters.
 August 6 – Tim Berners-Lee announces the World Wide Web project and software on the alt.hypertext newsgroup. The first website, "info.cern.ch", is created.
 August 7 – Former Iranian prime minister Shapour Bakhtiar is assassinated in the Parisian suburb of Suresnes.
 August 8 – The Warsaw radio mast, the tallest structure in the world at the time, collapses.
 August 17 – The remains of the Prussian King Frederick the Great are re-interred in Potsdam, Germany.
 August 17 – 20 – Hurricane Bob hits North Carolina and New England, killing 17 people and causing US$1.5 billion in damage.
 August 19 – Dissolution of the Soviet Union: Soviet President Mikhail Gorbachev is put under house arrest while vacationing in Crimea during an attempted coup. Led by Vice President Gennady Yanayev and seven others, the coup collapses in less than 72 hours and is protested by over 100,000 people outside the parliament building. He returns to Moscow three days later and arrests the coup leaders.
 August 20 – Singing Revolution: Estonia declares independence from the Soviet Union, followed by Latvia the next day.

 August 22 – Singing Revolution: Iceland becomes the first nation to recognize the independence of the Baltic states. It is followed by the U.S. on September 2 and the Soviet Union on September 6.
August 23 – Dissolution of the Soviet Union: Russia restores the white-blue-red tricolour as its national flag.
 August 24 – Dissolution of the Soviet Union: Ukraine declares independence, followed by Belarus the next day, from the Soviet Union.
 August 25
 Dissolution of Yugoslavia: Serbian forces begin an attack on the Croatian town of Vukovar.
 Linus Torvalds posts messages to the Usenet newsgroup comp.os.minix, regarding the new operating system kernel he had developed, called Linux.
Michael Schumacher, regarded as one of the greatest Formula One drivers in history, makes his Formula One debut at the Belgian Grand Prix.
 August 29 – Lebanon Hostage Crisis: Maronite general Michel Aoun leaves Lebanon via a French ship into exile.
 August 30 – Dissolution of the Soviet Union: Moldova declares independence from the Soviet Union, followed by Azerbaijan.
 August 31 – Dissolution of the Soviet Union: Kyrgyzstan and Uzbekistan declare their independence; Tajikistan follows suit on September 9.

September

 September 3 – In Hamlet, North Carolina, a grease fire breaks out at the Imperial Foods chicken processing plant, killing 25 people.
 September 4 – Sverdlovsk's name is restored to its pre-communist–era name Yekaterinburg. Two days later, Leningrad is renamed St. Petersburg.
 September 5 – Dissolution of the Soviet Union: The Congress of People's Deputies of the Soviet Union self-dissolves, being replaced by Supreme Soviet of the Soviet Union and State Council of the Soviet Union.
 September 8 – Dissolution of Yugoslavia: The Republic of Macedonia becomes independent, beginning a name dispute with Greece.
 September 11
Lebanon Hostage Crisis: Israel releases 51 Arab prisoners and the bodies of nine guerrillas, paving the way for the release of the last western hostages in Lebanon.
The Soviet Union announces plans to withdraw military and economic aid to Cuba.
 September 15 – In the Swedish general election, the Social Democrats suffer their worst election results in 60 years, leading to the resignation of Prime Minister Ingvar Carlsson.
 September 17 – North Korea, South Korea, Estonia, Latvia, Lithuania, the Marshall Islands, and Micronesia join the UN.
 September 19 – Ötzi the Iceman is found in the Alps.
 September 21 – Dissolution of the Soviet Union: Armenia declares independence from the Soviet Union. Nearly a month later on October 27, Turkmenistan declares its independence. Kazakhstan follows suit on December 16.
 September 21 – 30 – Iraq disarmament crisis: IAEA inspectors discover files on Iraq's hidden nuclear weapons program. Iraqi officials refuse to let them leave with the documents, prompting a standoff that continues until the UN Security Council threatens enforcement actions on Iraq.
 September 22 – The Huntington Library makes the Dead Sea Scrolls available to the public for the first time.
 September 24 – Lebanon Hostage Crisis: Lebanese kidnappers release Jackie Mann after more than two years of captivity.
 September 25 – Salvadoran Civil War: Representatives of the Farabundo Martí National Liberation Front reach an agreement with President of El Salvador Alfredo Cristiani, setting the stage for the end of the war.
 September 27 – U.S President George H. W. Bush announces unilateral reductions in short-range nuclear weapons and calls off 24-hour alerts for long-range bombers. The Soviet Union responds with similar unilateral reductions on October 5.
 September 29 – Salvadoran Civil War: An army colonel of the Atlácatl Battalion is found guilty of the 1989 murders of six Jesuits.

October
 October 1 – Dissolution of Yugoslavia: Forces of the Yugoslav People's Army surround Dubrovnik, beginning the Siege of Dubrovnik, which lasts until May 31, 1992.
 October 3 – Speaker of the U.S. House of Representatives Tom Foley announces the closure of the House Bank by the end of the year after revelations that House members have written numerous bad checks.
October 4 – Carl Bildt succeeds Ingvar Carlsson as Prime Minister of Sweden.
 October 6 – President Gorbachev condemns antisemitism in the Soviet Union in a statement read on the 50th anniversary of the Babi Yar massacres, which saw the death of 35,000 Jews in Ukraine during WWII.
 October 7 – Dissolution of Yugoslavia: The Yugoslav Air Force bombs the office of Croatian President Franjo Tuđman, causing the Croatian Parliament to cut all remaining ties with Yugoslavia the next day.
 October 11
 In the Russian SFSR, the KGB is replaced by the SVR, with the KGB officially ending operations on November 6.
 Iraq disarmament crisis: The UN Security Council passes Resolution 715, demanding that Iraq "accept unconditionally the inspectors and all other personnel designated by the Special Commission." Iraq rejects the resolution, calling it "unlawful".
 October 12 – Askar Akayev is confirmed as the first president of Kyrgyzstan in an uncontested poll.
 October 13 – In the Bulgarian parliamentary election, the Union of Democratic Forces defeats the Bulgarian Socialist Party, leaving no remaining Communist governments in Eastern Europe.
 October 15
 Clarence Thomas is confirmed as the new U.S. Supreme Court Justice following Thurgood Marshall's retirement.
 The leaders of the Baltic States, Arnold Rüütel of Estonia, Anatolijs Gorbunovs of Latvia and the Vytautas Landsbergis of Lithuania, signed the OSCE Final Act in Helsinki, Finland.
 October 18 – The Soviet Union restores its diplomatic relations with Israel, which had been suspended since the 1967 Six-Day War.
 October 20
 The Harare Declaration is signed in Harare, Zimbabwe, laying down the Commonwealth of Nations membership criteria.
 A large suburban firestorm centered in Oakland Hills, California, kills 25 people and injures 150 others.
 A 6.8 Mw earthquake strikes Uttarkashi, India, killing at least 768 people and destroying thousands of homes.
 October 21 – Lebanon Hostage Crisis: Jesse Turner, a mathematics professor who has been held hostage for more than four years, is released.
 October 23 – In Paris, the Vietnam-backed government of the state of Cambodia signs an agreement with the Khmer Rouge to end the civil war and bring the Khmer Rouge into power despite its role in the Cambodian genocide. The deal ends the Cambodian–Vietnamese War and results in the creation of the UN Transitional Authority in Cambodia.
 October 27 – The first free parliamentary elections in Poland since 1928 are held.
 October 28 – November 4 – The 1991 Perfect Storm strikes the northeastern U.S. coast and Atlantic Canada, causing over US$200 million of damage and resulting in 12 direct fatalities.
 October 29 – NASA's Galileo spacecraft makes its closest approach to 951 Gaspra, becoming the first probe to visit an asteroid.
 October 31 – November 3 – The Halloween blizzard hits the U.S. Upper Midwest, killing 22 people and causing US$100 million in damage.

November 

 November 4 – 5 – End of Apartheid: The African National Congress leads a general strike, demanding representation in the government and an end to the value-added tax.
 November 5 – China and Vietnam restore diplomatic relations after a 13-year rift which followed the 1979 Sino-Vietnamese War.
 November 6 – The CPSU and its republic-level division, the Communist Party of the Russian SFSR, are banned in the Russian SFSR by presidential decree.
 November 7 – The first report on carbon nanotubes is published by Sumio Iijima in Nature.
 November 9 – The British JET fusion reactor generates 1.5 MW output power.
 November 14
American and British authorities announce indictments against two Libyan intelligence officials in connection with the downing of the Pan Am Flight 103.
 Cambodian Prince Norodom Sihanouk returns to Phnom Penh after 13 years of exile.
 Lebanon Hostage Crisis: Kidnappers in Lebanon set Anglican Church envoys Terry Waite and Thomas Sutherland free.
 November 18
 Dissolution of Yugoslavia: The forces of the Yugoslav People's Army (JNA) and Serb paramilitaries take the Croatian town of Vukovar after the 87-day Battle of Vukovar. They kill more than 260 Croatian prisoners of war.
 An Azerbaijani Mil Mi-8 helicopter carrying a 19-member peacekeeping mission team is shot down by Armenian military forces in Khojavend district, Azerbaijan.
 November 21 – The UN Security Council recommends Egypt's deputy prime minister Boutros Boutros-Ghali to be the next Secretary-General of the UN.
 November 23 – Members of the Communist Party of Great Britain vote to dissolve the party and found the think-tank Democratic Left in its place.
 November 24 – Queen lead singer Freddie Mercury dies in London from AIDS induced pneumonia. In an unrelated incident, Kiss drummer Eric Carr dies from heart cancer.
 November 26 – The National Assembly of Azerbaijan abolishes the autonomous status of the Nagorno-Karabakh Autonomous Oblast and renames several cities to their Azeri names.
 November 27 – Dissolution of Yugoslavia: The UN Security Council unanimously adopts a resolution opening the way to the establishment of peacekeeping operations in Yugoslavia.

December 

 December 1 – Dissolution of the Soviet Union: Ukrainians vote overwhelmingly for independence from the Soviet Union in a referendum.
 December 4
 Lebanon Hostage Crisis: Journalist Terry A. Anderson is released after seven years of captivity as a hostage in Beirut – the last and longest-held American hostage in Lebanon.
John Leonard Orr, one of the most prolific serial arsonists of the 20th century, is arrested in California.
 December 8 – Dissolution of the Soviet Union: In the Białowieża Forest Nature Reserve in Belarus, the leaders of Russia, Belarus, and Ukraine sign an agreement officially ending the Soviet Union and establishing the Commonwealth of Independent States (CIS) in its place.
 December 11 – Dissolution of Yugoslavia: Croatian forces kill 18 Serbs and one Hungarian in the village of Paulin Dvor, Croatia.
 December 12 
 The government of Nigeria moves the capital from Lagos to Abuja.
Ukraine becomes the first post-Soviet republic to decriminalize homosexuality.
 December 15 – The Egyptian ferry  sinks in the Red Sea, killing more than 450 people.
 December 16 – The UN General Assembly adopts UN General Assembly Resolution 46/86, repealing a previous resolution adopted in 1975 which had ruled that Zionism is a form of racism.
 December 19
Paul Keating defeats Bob Hawke in a Labor Party leadership ballot and consequently becomes the Prime Minister of Australia; he is sworn in the following day.
 December 21 – The North Atlantic Cooperation Council (NAC-C) meets for the first time.
 December 22 – Armed opposition groups launch a military coup against President of Georgia Zviad Gamsakhurdia.
 December 24 – Dissolution of the Soviet Union: Russian SFSR President Boris Yeltsin sends a letter to UN Secretary-General Javier Pérez de Cuéllar, declaring that Russia will be the succeeding country to the collapsing Soviet Union in the United Nations.
 December 25
 Dissolution of the Soviet Union: Mikhail Gorbachev resigns as president of the Soviet Union, from which most republics have already seceded, anticipating the dissolving of the 69-year-old state.
 The Russian SFSR officially renames itself the Russian Federation.
 December 26 – Dissolution of the Soviet Union: The Supreme Soviet meets for the last time, formally dissolves the Soviet Union, and adjourns sine die, ending the Cold War. All remaining Soviet institutions eventually cease operation on December 31.

Births

January

 January 1 – Peter Burling, New Zealand sailor
 January 3 – Goo Hara, South Korean singer and actress (d. 2019)
 January 3 – Mohammed Ahmed, Somali born-Canadian long distance runner
 January 7
 Eden Hazard, Belgian football player
 Caster Semenya, South African athlete
 January 9 – Álvaro Soler, Spanish-German singer
 January 10 – Gonzalo Pérez de Vargas, Spanish handball player
 January 12 – Pixie Lott, British singer
 January 15 
 Nicolai Jørgensen, Danish footballer
 Darya Klishina, Russian long jumper
 January 16 – Mohammad Sanad, Egyptian handball player
 January 17 
 Trevor Bauer, American baseball player 
 Willa Fitzgerald, American actress
 Simon Gougnard, Belgian field hockey player
 Esapekka Lappi, Finnish rally driver
 January 19 – Erin Sanders, American actress
 January 20 – Jolyon Palmer, British racing driver, motorsport commentator and columnist
 January 21 – Craig Roberts, Welsh actor, writer and director
 January 23 – Steve Birnbaum, American footballer
 January 24 – Rodrigo Corrales, Spanish handball player
 January 25 – Sergey Karyakin, Russian rally raid driver
 January 28 – Calum Worthy, Canadian actor and musician
 January 29 – Hugh Grosvenor, British aristocrat, billionaire and businessman

February

 February 1 – Faouzi Ghoulam, French born-Algerian footballer
 February 2 –  Zhong Tianshi, Chinese track cyclist
 February 4 – Mathew Leckie, Australian footballer
 February 6
 Maxi Iglesias, Spanish actor and model
 Aleksandar Katai, Serbian footballer
 February 8
 Genzebe Dibaba, Ethiopian middle- and long-distance runner
 Wahbi Khazri, Tunisian footballer
 Michael Lang, Swiss footballer
 February 10 – Emma Roberts, American actress and singer
 February 12 – Martine Grael, Brazilian sailor
 February 14
 Raquel Calderón Argandoña, Chilean actress, singer, and lawyer
 Karol G, Colombian reggaeton singer and songwriter
 Anna Kiesenhofer, Austrian racing cyclist and mathematician
 February 16 – Tatiana Ivanova, Russian luger
 February 17
 Ed Sheeran, English singer, songwriter, guitarist, record producer, and actor
 Bonnie Wright, English actress, film director, screenwriter, model, and producer
 February 18
 Malese Jow, American actress and singer
 Henry Surtees, British racing driver (d. 2009)
 February 20 – Hidilyn Diaz, Filipina Olympic weightlifter and airwoman
 February 21
 Riyad Mahrez, French-Algerian footballer
 Solar, South Korean singer and actress 
 Joe Alwyn, English actor 
 February 22 – Robin Stjernberg, Swedish pop singer
 February 26 – CL, South Korean singer and dancer
 February 28 – Sarah Bolger, Irish actress

March

 March 1 – Ekaterina Guliyev, Russian born-Turkish athlete
 March 3 – Park Cho-rong, South Korean singer and actress 
 March 4 
 Aoi Nakamura, Japanese actor
 Hui Ruoqi, Chinese volleyball player
 March 5 – Ramiro Funes Mori, Argentine footballer
 March 6 – Tyler, The Creator, American rapper
 March 7 – Yekaterina Ilyina, Russian handball player
 March 8 – Devon Werkheiser, American actor, singer, and musician
 March 11
 Linlin, Chinese singer
 Poonam Pandey, Indian Bollywood actress 
 March 12 – Kahena Kunze, Brazilian sailor
 March 13 – Luan Santana, Brazilian singer 
 March 16 – Wolfgang Van Halen, American musician
 March 20 – Alexis Pinturault, French alpine skier
 March 21 – Antoine Griezmann, French footballer
 March 22 – Kentin Mahé, French handball player
 March 23 – Madelyn Deutch, American actress, director, musician and writer

 March 28 
 Derek Carr, American football player
 Jordan McRae, American basketball player
 March 29
 Irene, South Korean singer, rapper, television host, and model She grew up in Buk-gu.
 N'Golo Kanté, French footballer
 Hayley McFarland, American actress

April

 April 1 – Carter Ashton, Canadian Ice Hockey player
 April 3 – Hayley Kiyoko, American singer and actress
 April 4 – Jamie Lynn Spears, American singer and actress
 April 5
 Nathaniel Clyne, English footballer
 Nora Mørk, Norwegian handball player
 Yassine Bounou, Moroccan football player
 April 7 – Anne-Marie, English singer
 April 9 – Gai Assulin, Israeli footballer
 April 10 – AJ Michalka, American actress, voice actress, singer and musician
 April 11
 Thiago Alcântara, Spanish footballer
 James Magnussen, Australian swimmer
 April 12 
 Liu Shiwen, Chinese table tennis player
 Magnus Pääjärvi, Swedish Ice Hockey player
 April 13 – Brankica Mihajlović, Serbian volleyball player
 April 15 
 Javier Fernandez, Spanish figure skater
 Anastasia Vinnikova, Belarusian singer
 April 20 – Luke Kuechly, American football player
 April 21 – Ricky Brabec, American professional motorcycle racer
 April 25 – Alex Shibutani, American ice dancer
 April 27 – Lara Gut-Behrami, Swiss alpine skier

May

 May 2
 Jeong Jinwoon, South Korean idol singer and actor 
 Ilya Zakharov, Russian diver
 May 3 – Carlo Acutis, English-born Italian Catholic computer programmer, beatified (d. 2006)
 May 5 – Raúl Jiménez, Mexican footballer
 May 8 
 Kalkidan Gezahegne, Ethiopian-born Bahraini middle- and long-distance runner
 Yuki Ishii, Japanese volleyball player
 May 9 – Majlinda Kelmendi, Kosovan judoka
 May 16 – Grigor Dimitrov, Bulgarian tennis player
 May 17 – Iñigo Martínez, Spanish footballer
 May 18 – Shanne Braspennincx, Dutch track cyclist
 May 19 – Savannah Marshall, English boxer
 May 22
 Sophia Abrahão, Brazilian actress
 Suho, South Korean singer, actor, and model
 May 23 – Lena Meyer-Landrut, German singer
 May 24 – Erika Umeda, Japanese singer 
 May 25 – Derrick Williams, American basketball player
 May 27 – Beauden Barrett, New Zealand rugby union player
 May 28 
 Ji Dong-won, South Korean footballer
 Alexandre Lacazette, French footballer
 May 29 
 Yaime Pérez, Cuban discus thrower
 Tan Zhongyi, Chinese chess player 
 May 31 – Azealia Banks, American singer

June

 June 1 
 Zazie Beetz, German-American actress
 Amy Pieters, Dutch racing cyclist
 June 4 – Ben Stokes, English international cricketer
 June 5 – Kent Robin Tønnesen, Norwegian handball player
 June 6 – Ashley Park, American actress
 June 7 
 Emily Ratajkowski, American model and actress
 Olivia Rogowska, Australian tennis player
 Fetty Wap, American rapper
 June 10 – Pol Espargaró, Spanish motorcycle racer
 June 12 – Sebastián Solé, Argentine born-Italian volleyball player
 June 13 
 Will Claye, American long and triple jumper
 Katie Nageotte, American pole vaulter
 June 14
 André Carrillo, Peruvian footballer
 Kostas Manolas, Greek footballer
 Jesy Nelson, English singer
 Anne-Marie Rindom, Danish sailor
 June 16
 Siya Kolisi, South African rugby union player
 Joe McElderry, British singer and model
 Tameka Yallop, Australian footballer
 June 17 – Kayane, French esports player and journalist
 June 18 – Willa Holland, American model and actress 
 June 19 – Neta Rivkin, Israeli rhythmic gymnast
 June 20 
 Kalidou Koulibaly, French-Senegalese footballer
 Rasmus Lauge, Danish handball player
 June 21 – J. C. Greyling, Namibian rugby union player
 June 23
 Katie Armiger, American singer
 Fakhreddine Ben Youssef, Tunisian footballer
 June 24 – Max Ehrich, American actor, singer, and dancer
 June 25
 Christa Théret, French actress
 Victor Wanyama, Kenyan footballer
 June 28
 Kevin De Bruyne, Belgian footballer
 Seohyun, South Korean singer and actress 
 June 29 
 Kawhi Leonard, American basketball player
 Addison Timlin, American actress

July

 July 2
 Kim Go-eun, South Korean actress
 Burna Boy, Nigerian singer, rapper and songwriter
 July 3 – Anastasia Pavlyuchenkova, Russian tennis player
 July 5 – Jason Dolley, American actor and musician
 July 7 – Alesso, Swedish DJ and music producer 
 July 8 – Virgil van Dijk, Dutch footballer
 July 9 – Mitchel Musso, American actor, musician and singer
 July 10 – Atsuko Maeda, Japanese singer and actress
 July 12
 Pablo Carreño Busta, Spanish tennis player
 James Rodríguez, Colombian footballer
 Erik Per Sullivan, American actor

 July 13 – Seppe Smits, Belgian snowboarder
 July 14 – Rossella Fiamingo, Italian fencer
 July 15 – Evgeny Tishchenko, Russian heavyweight boxer
 July 16 – Alexandra Shipp, American actress
 July 21 – Sara Sampaio, Portuguese model
 July 22 – Tomi Juric, Australian footballer
 July 23 
 Lauren Mitchell, Australian artistic gymnast
 Kianoush Rostami, Iranian weightlifter
 July 24 
 Emily Bett Rickards, Canadian actress
 Cristina Gutiérrez, Spanish dentist and rally raid driver
 July 25 – Amanda Kurtović, Norwegian handball player
 July 29 – Orlando Ortega, Cuban born-Spanish hurdler
 July 30 – Daria Kondakova, Russian rhythmic gymnast
 July 31 – Filipa Azevedo, Portuguese singer

August

 August 3 – Mayra Aguiar, Brazilian judoka
 August 6
 Irina Kulikova, Russian fashion model
 Jiao Liuyang, Chinese swimmer
 August 7 – Mike Trout, American baseball player
 August 8 – Joël Matip, German born-Cameroonian footballer
 August 9
 Alexa Bliss, American professional wrestler
 Hansika Motwani, Indian actress
 August 10 – Pratyusha Banerjee, Indian television actress (d. 2016)
 August 11 
 Estelle Nze Minko, French handball player
 Tamirat Tola, Ethiopian long distance and marathon runner
 August 12 
 Mads Mensah Larsen, Danish handball player
 Khris Middleton, American basketball player
 Lakeith Stanfield, American actor and rapper
 August 16
 Anna Gasser, Austrian snowboarder
 Evanna Lynch, Irish actress
 Young Thug, American hip hop artist
 August 18 – Brianna Rollins-McNeal, American track and field athlete
 August 19 – Loïck Luypaert, Belgian field hockey player
 August 20 – Cory Joseph, Canadian basketball player
 August 22 
 Christian O'Sullivan, Norwegian handball player
 Brayden Schenn, Canadian Ice Hockey Player
 Ysaora Thibus, French foil fencer
 August 23 – Jennifer Abel, Canadian diver
 August 24 – Wang Zhen, Chinese racewalker
 August 25 – Leon Edwards, Jamaican born-English professional mixed martial artist
 August 26 
 Gauthier Boccard, Belgian field hockey player
 Dylan O'Brien, American actor
 August 30 – Gaia Weiss, French actress and model
 August 31 
 António Félix da Costa, Portuguese racing driver
 Shi Tingmao, Chinese diver

September

 September 2 – Mareks Mejeris, Latvian basketball player
 September 3 – Nicolás Cavigliasso, Argentine four-wheeler motorcycle rider
 September 4
 Aleksandar Atanasijević, Serbian volleyball player
 Adrien Bart, French sprint canoeist
 Carter Jenkins, American actor
September 5 – Skandar Keynes, English actor
 September 9 
 Kelsey Chow, American actress
 Oscar dos Santos Emboaba Júnior, Brazilian footballer
 Lauren Daigle, American singer and songwriter
 Hunter Hayes, American singer, songwriter, record producer and multi-instrumentalist
 September 11
 Jordan Ayew, Ghanaian footballer
 Kygo, Norwegian DJ and record producer
 September 12 – Thomas Meunier, Belgian footballer
 September 13 – Ksenia Afanasyeva, Russian artistic gymnast
 September 14 – Nana, South Korean singer, actress, and model
 September 16 – Marlon Teixeira, Brazilian model
 September 17
 Minako Kotobuki, Japanese actress and singer
 Mena Massoud, Canadian actor
 Sanne Wevers, Dutch gymnast
September 20 
 Kelsey-Lee Barber, Australian javelin thrower
 Anna Kárász, Hungarian sprint canoeist
 Marlen Reusser, Swiss racing cyclist
 September 23 – Key, Korean singer
 September 25 
 Stine Bredal Oftedal, Norwegian handball player
 Emmy Clarke, American actress
 Alexander Rossi, American race car driver
 September 27 – Simona Halep, Romanian tennis player
 September 29 – Enzo Lefort, French foil fencer
 September 30 – Thomas Röhler, German javelin thrower

October

 October 1 – Gus Kenworthy, British-American Olympic freestyle skier, actor, and YouTuber
 October 2 – Roberto Firmino, Brazilian footballer
 October 4 – Leigh-Anne Pinnock, English singer and songwriter
 October 6 
 Roshon Fegan, American actor, rapper, and dancer
 Mathieu Grébille, French handball player
 October 7 
 Nicole Jung, Korean-American singer in Glendale, California
 Lay Zhang, Chinese singer, actor, dancer, and producer<
 October 10
 Gabriella Cilmi, Australian singer
 Lali Espósito, Argentine actress, singer, dancer, and model
 Mariana Pajón, Colombian cyclist
 Xherdan Shaqiri, Swiss footballer 
 October 11 – Toby Fox, American video game developer and video game composer
 October 15 – Josefin Asplund, Swedish actress
 October 16 
 Phan Thi Ha Thanh, Vietnamese artistic gymnast
 Jedward (John and Edward Grimes), Irish twin pop singers
 October 17 – Brenda Asnicar, Argentine actress and singer
 October 18 – Tyler Posey, American actor and musician
 October 19 – Alyz Henrich, Venezuelan model, environmentalist, humanitarian advocate and beauty queen
 October 21 – Artur Aleksanyan, Armenian Greco-Roman wrestler
 October 23 
 Emil Forsberg, Swedish footballer
 Princess Mako of Akishino, Japanese princess
 October 26 – Amala Paul, Indian film actress
 October 27 – Islam Makhachev, Russian professional mixed martial artist
 October 28 
 Marcos Acuña, Argentine fooballer
 Lucy Bronze, English footballer
 October 29 – Anita Blaze, French fencer
 October 30
 Artemi Panarin, Russian ice hockey player
 Tomáš Satoranský, Czech basketball player

November

 November 1 
 Jiang Yuyuan, Chinese gymnast
 Anthony Ramos, American actor, singer and songwriter
 November 4 
 Olta Boka, Albanian singer 
 Bee Vang, American actor
 November 6 – Camila Finn, Brazilian model
 November 11 – Christa B. Allen, American actress
 November 12 – Takatoshi Abe, Japanese track and field athlete
 November 13 
 Devon Bostick, Canadian actor
 Magnus Gullerud, Norwegian handball player
 November 14 – Taylor Hall, Canadian Ice Hockey player
 November 15 – Shailene Woodley, American actress, producer, and activist
 November 16 – Park Hyung-sik, South Korean singer, dancer and actor
 November 20 – Kim Se-yong, South Korean singer and actor
 November 21
 Almaz Ayana, Ethiopian long-distance runner
 Dmitry Martynov, Russian actor
 November 23 – Christian Cueva, Peruvian footballer
 November 24 – Baghdad Bounedjah, Algerian footballer
 November 27 – Himanshi Khurana, Indian model, actress and singer
 November 29 – Becky James, Welsh racing cyclist

December

 December 1 – Sun Yang, Chinese swimmer
 December 2
 Anne Buijs, Dutch volleyball player
 Chloe Dufour-Lapointe, Canadian freestyle skier
 Brandon Knight, American basketball player
 Charlie Puth, American singer
 December 4 
 Hayley Arceneaux, American physician assistant and astronaut
 Max Holloway, American mixed martial artist
 December 5 – Christian Yelich, American baseball player
 December 6
 Milica Mandić, Serbian taekwondo athlete
 CoCo Vandeweghe, American tennis player
 December 9 
 Choi Min-ho, South Korean rapper and TV host
 Johannes Rydzek, German nordic combined skier
 December 10 – Kiki Bertens, Dutch tennis player
 December 11 – Anna Bergendahl, Swedish singer
 December 12 – Demi Stokes, English footballer
 December 15 – Eunice Cho, Korean-American actress
 December 19
 Jorge Blanco, Mexican musician, singer, dancer, and actor
 Sumire Uesaka, Japanese voice actress and singer
 December 20
 Jorginho, Brazilian-Italian footballer
 Jillian Rose Reed, American actress
 December 22 – DaBaby, American rapper
 December 24 – Louis Tomlinson, British singer
 December 26
 Andritany Ardhiyasa, Indonesian footballer
 Eden Sher, American actress
 December 27 – Chloe Bridges, American actress
 December 28 – Belime, Lebanese-born singer
 December 30 
 Camila Giorgi, Italian tennis player
 Jessica Springsteen, American equestrian

Deaths

January

 January 2 – Renato Rascel, Italian actor and singer (b. 1912)
 January 4 
 Poon Lim, Chinese sailor (b. 1918)
 Richard Maibaum, American film producer, playwright and screenwriter (b. 1909)
 January 5 – Vasko Popa, Yugoslavian poet (b. 1922)
 January 8 – Steve Clark, English guitarist (b. 1960)
 January 11 – Carl David Anderson, American physicist, Nobel Prize laureate (b. 1905)
 January 12
 Keye Luke, Chinese-born actor (b. 1904)
 Vasco Pratolini, Italian writer (b. 1913)
 January 14 – Salah Khalaf, Palestinian officer (b. 1933)
 January 17 – King Olav V of Norway (b. 1903)
 January 22 – Kenas Aroi, Nauruan politician (b. 1942)
 January 25
 Lilian Bond, English actress (b. 1908)
 Frank Soo, English footballer and manager (b. 1914)
 January 28 – Red Grange, American football player (Chicago Bears) and member of the Pro Football Hall of Fame (b. 1903)
 January 29 – Yasushi Inoue, Japanese historian (b. 1907)
 January 30
 John Bardeen, American physicist, Nobel Prize laureate (b. 1908)
 John McIntire, American actor (b. 1907)

February

 February 1 – Carol Dempster, American actress (b. 1901)
 February 3 – Nancy Kulp, American actress (b. 1921)
 February 5
 Pedro Arrupe, Spanish priest (b. 1907)
 Dean Jagger, American actor (b. 1903)
 February 6
 Salvador Luria, Italian-born American Nobel biologist (b. 1912)
 Danny Thomas, American singer, comedian, and actor (b. 1912)
 María Zambrano, Spanish essayist and philosopher (b. 1904)
 February 13 – Arno Breker, German sculptor (b. 1900)
 February 14 – John A. McCone, American politician, 6th Director of Central Intelligence (b. 1902)
 February 21
 John Sherman Cooper, American politician (b. 1901)
 Margot Fonteyn, English ballet dancer (b. 1919)
 February 24 – Jean Rogers, American actress (b. 1916)
 February 25 – Sverre Hansen, Norwegian long jumper (b. 1899)

March

 March 1 – Edwin H. Land, inventor of the Polaroid instant camera (b. 1909)
 March 2 – Serge Gainsbourg, French singer (b. 1928)
 March 3 – William Penney, Baron Penney, British nuclear physicist (b. 1909)
 March 12 – Ragnar Granit, Finnish neuroscientist, recipient of the Nobel Prize in Physiology or Medicine (b. 1900)
 March 14
 Howard Ashman, American lyricist (b. 1950)
 Doc Pomus, American composer (b. 1925)
 March 15 – Robin Hill, British plant biochemist (b. 1899)
 March 18 – Vilma Bánky, Hungarian-born actress (b. 1901)
 March 21 – Leo Fender, American instrument maker (b. 1909)
 March 23 – Elisaveta Bagriana, Bulgarian poet, Nobel Prize in Literature (b. 1893)
 March 24 – Sir John Kerr, Governor-General of Australia (b. 1914)
 March 25 – Marcel Lefebvre, French Roman Catholic bishop (b. 1905)
 March 27 – Aldo Ray, American actor (b. 1926)
 March 29 – Lee Atwater, American political consultant and strategist (b. 1951)

April

 April 1
 Martha Graham, American dancer and choreographer (b. 1894)
 Paulo Muwanga, Ugandan military officer and statesman, 3rd Prime Minister of Uganda and 6th President of Uganda (b. 1921)
 April 3 – Graham Greene, English novelist (b. 1904)
 April 4 – Max Frisch, Swiss writer (b. 1911)
 April 5
 Sonny Carter, American astronaut (b. 1947)
 John Tower, American politician (b. 1925)
 William Sidney, 1st Viscount De L'Isle, former Governor-General of Australia (b. 1909)
 April 8
 Dead, black metal vocalist (b. 1969)
 April 9 – Forrest Towns, American Olympic athlete (b. 1914)
 April 10
 Kevin Peter Hall, American actor (b. 1955)
 Natalie Schafer, American actress (b. 1900)
 April 14 – Dhalia, Indonesian actress (b. 1925)
 April 16 – David Lean, English film director (b. 1908)
 April 20
 Steve Marriott, English musician (b. 1947)
 Don Siegel, American film director (b. 1912)
 Yumjaagiin Tsedenbal, Mongolian Communist leader, former Party General Secretary, Prime Minister of Mongolia (b. 1916)
 April 23 – Johnny Thunders, American guitarist, singer and songwriter (b. 1952)
 April 26 – Carmine Coppola, American composer and conductor (b. 1910)
 April 27 – Robert Velter, French cartoonist (b. 1909)

May

 May 1
 Cesare Merzagora, Italian politician (b. 1898)
 Richard Thorpe, American film director (b. 1896)
 May 3 – Jerzy Kosiński, Polish-American writer (b. 1933)
 May 4 – Mohammed Abdel Wahab, Egyptian singer and composer (b. 1902)
 May 6 – Wilfrid Hyde-White, British actor (b. 1903)
 May 8
 Jean Langlais, French composer and organist (b. 1907)
 Rudolf Serkin, Austrian pianist (b. 1903)
 May 14 – Jiang Qing, Chinese radical revolutionary, widow of Mao Zedong (b. 1914)
 May 15
 Shintaro Abe, Japanese politician (b. 1924)
 Ronald Lacey, English actor (b. 1935)
 May 21
 Lino Brocka, Filipino film director (b. 1939)
 Rajiv Gandhi, 6th Prime Minister of India (b. 1944)
 May 22
 Derrick Henry Lehmer, American mathematician (b. 1905)
 Stan Mortensen, English footballer (b. 1921)
 May 23
 Jean Van Houtte, Belgian politician, 38th Prime Minister of Belgium (b. 1907)
 Wilhelm Kempff, German pianist (b. 1895)
 May 24 – Gene Clark, American singer (b. 1944)
 May 29 – Coral Browne, Australian actress (b. 1913)
 May 31 – Angus Wilson, English novelist (b. 1913)

June

 June 1 – David Ruffin, American singer (b. 1941)
 June 2 – Hailu Yimenu, Ethiopian politician, acting Prime Minister of Ethiopia
 June 3 – Eva Le Gallienne, English-born actress (b. 1899)
 June 6 – Stan Getz, American jazz saxophonist (b. 1927)
 June 9 – Claudio Arrau, Chilean-born pianist (b. 1903)
 June 14 – Peggy Ashcroft, British actress (b. 1907)
 June 15
 Happy Chandler, 2nd commissioner of Major League Baseball (b. 1898)
 W. Arthur Lewis, Saint Lucian economist, Nobel Prize laureate (b. 1915)
 June 18 – Joan Caulfield, American actress (b. 1922)
 June 19 – Jean Arthur, American actress (b. 1900)
 June 20 – Harry Collinson, planning officer
 June 24 – Rufino Tamayo, Mexican painter (b. 1899)
 June 28 – Hans Nüsslein, German tennis player (b. 1910)
 June 29 – Henri Lefebvre, French sociologist and philosopher (b. 1901)

July

 July 1 – Michael Landon, American actor, writer, director, and producer (b. 1936)
 July 2 – Lee Remick, American actress (b. 1935)
 July 5 – Mildred Dunnock, American actress (b. 1901)
 July 6 
 Mudashiru Lawal, Nigerian footballer (b. 1954)
 Anton Yugov, Bulgarian Communist politician, 35th Prime Minister of Bulgaria (b. 1904)
 July 8 – James Franciscus, American actor (b. 1934)
 July 11 – Mokhtar Dahari, Malaysian footballer (b. 1953)
 July 12 – Hitoshi Igarashi, Japanese interpreter (b. 1947)
 July 15 – Roger Revelle, American scientist and scholar (b. 1909)
 July 16 – Robert Motherwell, American painter (b. 1915)
 July 18 – Ambrus Nagy, Hungarian fencer and Olympic silver medalist (1956) (b. 1927)
 July 24 – Isaac Bashevis Singer, Polish-born Yiddish writer, Nobel Prize laureate (b. 1902)
 July 25 – Lazar Kaganovich, Soviet politician, former member of the CPSU Politburo and Deputy Prime Minister (b. 1893)
 July 27 – Pierre Brunet, French figure skater (b. 1902)
 July 29 – Christian de Castries, French general (b. 1902)

August

 August 3 – Ali Sabri, Egyptian politician, 32nd Prime Minister of Egypt (b. 1920)
 August 4 – Yevgeny Dragunov, Russian weapons designer (b. 1920)
 August 5
 Paul Brown, American football coach (b. 1908)
 Soichiro Honda, Japanese engineer and industrialist (b. 1917)
 August 6
 Shapour Bakhtiar, Iranian politician, 45th Prime Minister of Iran (b. 1915)
 Harry Reasoner, American journalist and newscaster (b. 1923)
 August 8 
 James Irwin, American astronaut (b. 1930)
 Ivan Kozhedub, Soviet aviator (b. 1920)
 August 13 – James Roosevelt, American businessman, Marine, activist, and politician (b. 1907)
 August 16 – Luigi Zampa, Italian film-maker (b. 1905)
 August 22
 Colleen Dewhurst, Canadian-born American actress (b. 1924)
 Boris Pugo, Latvian communist politician, Soviet minister of the Interior (b. 1937)
 August 23 – Florence B. Seibert, American biochemist (b. 1897)
 August 24 – Sergey Akhromeyev, Marshall of the Soviet Union, Chief of the General Staff of the Soviet Armed Forces (b. 1923)
 August 30
 Cyril Knowles, English footballer and manager (b. 1944)
 Jean Tinguely, Swiss painter and sculptor (b. 1925)

September

 September 2 – Alfonso García Robles, Mexican diplomat and politician, recipient of the Nobel Peace Prize (b. 1911)
 September 3 
 Frank Capra, Italian-born American film director (b. 1897)
 Daniel Prenn, Russian-born German, Polish, and British tennis player (b. 1904)
 September 4 – Tom Tryon, American actor and writer (b. 1926)
 September 7 – Edwin McMillan, American chemist, Nobel Prize laureate (b. 1907)
 September 8
 Alex North, American film composer (b. 1910)
 Brad Davis, American actor (b. 1949)
 September 10 – Jack Crawford, Australian tennis champion (b. 1908)
 September 13 – Joe Pasternak, Hungarian-born film director (b. 1901)
 September 17 – Zino Francescatti, French violinist (b. 1902)
 September 24 – Dr. Seuss (Theodor Seuss Geisel), American author (b. 1904)
 September 25
 Klaus Barbie, German Gestapo leader in Lyon (b. 1913)
 Viviane Romance, French actress (b. 1912)
 September 27 – Oona O'Neill, English actress (b. 1925)
 September 28 – Miles Davis, American jazz trumpeter, bandleader, and composer (b. 1926)

October

 October 2 – Patriarch Demetrios I of Constantinople (b. 1914)
 October 6 – Igor Talkov, Russian singer, poet, and composer (b. 1956)
 October 7 – Natalia Ginzburg, Italian author (b. 1916)
 October 9 – Roy Black, German schlager actor and singer (b. 1943)
 October 11 – Redd Foxx, American comedian and actor (b. 1922)
 October 12
 Aline MacMahon, American actress (b. 1899)
 Arkady Strugatsky, Soviet-Russian sci-fi author (b. 1925)
 Regis Toomey, American actor (b. 1898)
 October 13 – Daniel Oduber Quirós, Costa Rican politician, 37th President of Costa Rica (b. 1921)
 October 16 – Ole Beich, Danish musician (b. 1955)
 October 17 – Tennessee Ernie Ford, American singer (b. 1919)
 October 24 – Gene Roddenberry, American television producer (b. 1921)
 October 25 – Bill Graham, American promoter (b. 1931)
 October 27 
 Howard Kingsbury, American Olympic rower – Men's eights (b. 1904)
 Andrzej Panufnik, Polish musician and composer (b. 1914)
 October 29 – Mario Scelba, Italian politician, 33rd Prime Minister of Italy and President of the European Parliament (b. 1901)

November

 November 2 
 Irwin Allen, American film and television producer (b. 1916)
 Mort Shuman, American singer, pianist and songwriter (b. 1938)
 November 5
 Fred MacMurray, American actor (b. 1908)
 Robert Maxwell, Slovakian-born media entrepreneur (b. 1923)
 November 6 – Gene Tierney, American actress (b. 1920)
 November 7 – Tom of Finland, Finnish artist (b. 1920)
 November 9 – Yves Montand, French actor and singer (b. 1921)
 November 10 – Eva Bosáková, Czechoslovakian artistic gymnast (b. 1931)
 November 13 – Paul-Émile Léger, Canadian cardinal (b. 1904)
 November 14 – Tony Richardson, English film and theater director (b. 1928)
 November 17 – Adrian Quist, Australian tennis player (b. 1913)
 November 18 – Gustáv Husák, Czechoslovak politician, 9th President of Czechoslovakia (b. 1913)
 November 19 – Reggie Nalder, Austrian actor (b. 1907)
 November 21 – Daniel Mann, American film director (b. 1912)
 November 23 – Klaus Kinski, German actor (b. 1926)
 November 24
 Eric Carr, American drummer (b. 1950)
 Freddie Mercury, British lead singer and pianist (b. 1946)
 November 25 – Eleanor Audley, American actress (b. 1905)
 November 26 – Ed Heinemann, American aircraft designer (b. 1908)
 November 29
 Ralph Bellamy, American actor (b. 1904)
 Nasirdin Isanov, 1st Prime Minister of Kyrgyzstan (b. 1943)
 Frank Yerby, African American historical novelist (b. 1916)

December

 December 1
 Pat O'Callaghan, Irish athlete (b. 1906)
 George Stigler, American economist, Nobel Prize laureate (b. 1911)
 December 6 – Sir Richard Stone, British economist, Nobel Prize laureate (b. 1913)
 December 7 – Gordon Pirie, English athlete (b. 1931)
 December 8 – Buck Clayton, American jazz trumpet player (b. 1911)
 December 9 – Berenice Abbott, American photographer (b. 1898)
 December 10 – Franco Maria Malfatti, Italian politician (b. 1927)
 December 11 – Artur Lundkvist, Swedish author (b. 1906)
 December 12 – Eleanor Boardman, American actress (b. 1898)
 December 15 – Vasily Zaytsev, Russian World War II hero (b. 1915)
 December 18 – George Abecassis, English racing driver (b. 1913)
 December 20 – Walter Chiari, Italian actor (b. 1924) 
 December 22 – Ernst Krenek, Austrian-American composer (b. 1900)
 December 27 – Hervé Guibert, French writer and photographer (b. 1955)
 December 28 – Cassandra Harris, Australian actress (b. 1948)

Nobel Prizes

 Chemistry – Richard R. Ernst
 Economics – Ronald Coase
 Literature – Nadine Gordimer
 Peace – Aung San Suu Kyi
 Physics – Pierre-Gilles de Gennes
 Physiology or Medicine – Erwin Neher, Bert Sakmann

References